Cooperia was a genus of tender herbaceous perennials native to South America and the southern reaches of North America.  Along with the former genus Habranthus, Cooperia is now included in a more broadly circumscribed genus Zephyranthes, a member of the amaryllis family, Amaryllidaceae. All three genera were commonly known as rain lilies because of their propensity for blooming after rains. Species formerly placed in Cooperia bloom in summer and fall.

Although Cooperia was considered distinguishable from the better known rain lily genus, Zephyranthes, by its fragrance similar to primroses, its white or yellow pollen, its tolerance for drout and desert conditions (Howard 2001:54) and tendency to be night-blooming (Ogden 1994:11), it is now considered to be part of Zephyranthes and the genus name Cooperia is no longer accepted.

Cultivation 
Hybrids have been successfully created with species then placed in separate genera Zephyranthes (× Cooperanthes) and Habranthus (× Cooperanthus) (Ogden 1994:11, Howard 2001:54). All are now within Zephyranthes.

See also

 List of plants known as lily

References

Bibliography

 Fellers, John D. "A Passion for Rainlilies: Cooperia, Habranthus, and Zephyranthes." Herbertia v51, 1996, pp 78–112.
 Howard, Thad M. Bulbs for Warm Climates. Austin, TX: University of Texas Press, 2001, pp 53; 54-56.
 Ogden, Scott. Garden Bulbs for the South. Dallas, TX: Taylor Publishing Co., 1994, pp 5–27.

External links
Ladybird Johnson Wildflower Center Native Plant Information Network entry
USDA PLANTS entry
Texas A&M Research and Extension Center profile

Amaryllidoideae
Night-blooming plants
Flora of Texas
Amaryllidaceae genera
Historically recognized angiosperm genera